Champions Cup Boston is an event in the Outback Champions Series for senior tennis players. It is held each year in Boston.

Finals results

2007 establishments in Massachusetts
2007 in Boston
Annual sporting events in the United States
Champions Series (senior men's tennis tour)
Defunct tennis tournaments in the United States
Recurring sporting events established in 2007
Sports competitions in Boston
Tennis tournaments in Massachusetts